The 2014 MTN 8 was the 40th edition of South Africa's annual soccer cup competition, the MTN 8. It featured the top eight teams of the Premier Soccer League at the end of the 2013-14 season.

Teams
The eight teams that competed in the MTN 8 knockout competition are (listed according to their finishing position in the 2013/2014 Premier Soccer League Season):
 1. Mamelodi Sundowns
 2. Kaizer Chiefs
 3. Bidvest Wits
 4. Orlando Pirates
 5. SuperSport United
 6. Bloemfontein Celtic
 7. Mpumalanga Black Aces
 8. Platinum Stars

Results

Quarter-finals

Semi-finals

1st Leg

2nd Leg

Final

References

MTN 8
MTN 8
MTN 8
MTN 8
MTN 8